Simonstone railway station was located on the east side of Simonstone Lane,  south of Simonstone centre and near Padiham, Lancashire, England. It was on a branch line (usually known as the Great Harwood loop) of the East Lancashire Line, from Burnley to Blackburn.

History
The line between Padiham and Rose Grove opened in 1875. West of Padiham it opened two years later as a result of difficulties in constructing the embankments between Great Harwood and Simonstone in the vicinity of Martholme Viaduct over the River Calder.

It was closed on 2 December 1957 and the station later demolished. The railway line from Burnley to Simonstone was partly retained as far as Blackburn Road, just west of Padiham, for continuing deliveries of coal to Padiham Power Station until the power station closed in 1993.

Part of the old station site has been converted to an industrial estate.

Greenway
Lancashire County Council began work in 2005 to convert part of the line to a footpath/bridleway/cycle path to be called Padiham Greenway. The Greenway was officially opened on 24 June 2010. It links to the River Calder Greenway and the towpath of the Leeds and Liverpool Canal to form a circular route and also has a branch to Gawthorpe Hall a National Trust property in Padiham. In 2017 the Martholme Greenway group reopened the section from Simonstone lane to Gooseleach wood as a public footpath. This required the manufacture and installation of two new bridges to replace ones removed when the line closed and the creation of access steps off Simonstone lane.

References

Disused railway stations in Ribble Valley
Former Lancashire and Yorkshire Railway stations
Railway stations in Great Britain opened in 1877
Railway stations in Great Britain closed in 1957